The Scherbadung (also known as Pizzo Cervandone or Monte Cervandone) is a mountain of the Lepontine Alps on the Swiss-Italian border. Its Italian name has been used to name the mineral cervandonite which has only been found there (Devero Alp; Devero Valley; Val Devero).

References

External links
 Scherbadung on Hikr

Mountains of the Alps
Alpine three-thousanders
Mountains of Switzerland
Mountains of Italy
Italy–Switzerland border
International mountains of Europe
Mountains of Valais
Lepontine Alps